Sweden's superlative trees have been ranked by various factors. Records have been kept for trees with superlative height, wood volume, age, and stoutness. This last one means trunk diameter or girth.

References

Trees in Sweden
Superlative in Sweden
Forest ecology